Nickajack Lake is the reservoir created by Nickajack Dam as part of the Tennessee Valley Authority.  The lake stretches from Nickajack Dam to Chickamauga Dam, passing through the city of Chattanooga. The Tennessee River Gorge, commonly referred to as the "Grand Canyon of Tennessee", is also part of Nickajack Lake.

A lake sturgeon was caught in Nickajack Lake in 2011. This was the first sighting of one in the lake since they left the area in the 1960s.

See also
Nickajack
Dams and reservoirs of the Tennessee River

References

Bodies of water of Hamilton County, Tennessee
Bodies of water of Marion County, Tennessee
Tennessee River
Reservoirs in Tennessee
Tennessee Valley Authority
Tourist attractions in Chattanooga, Tennessee
Geography of Chattanooga, Tennessee
Tourist attractions in Hamilton County, Tennessee
Tourist attractions in Marion County, Tennessee